Thuingaleng Muivah (born 3 March 1934) is a Naga separatist politician and General Secretary of the National Socialist Council of Nagaland(I-M).

Early career 

He joined the Naga National Council (NNC), an armed group campaigning for secession of Nagaland from India. He subsequently became the General Secretary of NNC. When a group of NNC leaders signed the Shillong Accord of 1975 with the Government of India, Muviah and some others denounced them as traitors.

NNC to NSCN

In 1980, a faction led by Isak Chishi Swu, S. S. Khaplang and Muivah broke away from NNC to form the National Socialist Council of Nagalim (NSCN). The NSCN was formed as a result of discontentment with the Shillong Accord, and continued secessionist activities abandoned by the NNC. The group later split into NSCN(I-M) led by Swu and Muivah, and NSCN (K) led by Khaplang due to major disagreements.

Peace talks 

NSCN (I-M) under the leadership of Thuingaleng Muivah and Isak Chishi Swu signed a ceasefire agreement with the Government of India in August 1997 after decades of engaging in hostile fighting with Indian security forces. The major breakthrough of the peace talk happened on 3 August 2015 with the signing of a peace accord between Muivah led NSCN(I-M) & Narendra Modi led Indian Government.

References

1934 births
Nagaland politicians
Living people
People from Ukhrul district
Manipur politicians
Indian independence activists from Nagaland

Naga nationalism